Hymenolaena is a genus of flowering plants belonging to the family Apiaceae.

Its native range is Afghanistan to Central Asia and Western Himalaya.

Species:

Hymenolaena badachschanica 
Hymenolaena candollei 
Hymenolaena polyphylla

References

Apioideae
Apioideae genera